Live at London's Talk of The Town is a 1970 live album recorded by The Temptations at the Talk of the Town nightclub in London, England. It was the final live album released by the group for over thirty years, until The Temptations in Japan, recorded in 1973, was released in 2004. 
The album reached No. 21 on the Billboard 200 Pop Album Chart, and No. 5 on its R&B album chart.

The songs performed included Temptations hits such as "My Girl", "I Can't Get Next to You" and "Cloud Nine".

Despite this album's success, as of 2016, it has never been released in the CD format. However its tracks are available for sale as a digital download, available on Amazon, I Tunes, and other websites.

Track listing
"Get Ready" (Smokey Robinson) (lead: Eddie Kendricks)
"Girl (Why You Wanna Make Me Blue)" (Norman Whitfield, Eddie Holland) (lead: Eddie Kendricks)
"Beauty Is Only Skin Deep" (Whitfield, Holland) (lead: Dennis Edwards)
"You're My Everything" (Roger Penzabene, Cornelius Grant, Whitfield) (lead: Eddie Kendricks, Dennis Edwards)
"My Girl" (Robinson, Ronnie White) (lead: Paul Williams)
"Ain't to Proud To Beg" (Holland, Whitfield) (lead: Dennis Edwards)
"I'm Gonna Make You Love Me" (Kenny Gamble, Leon Huff, Jerry Ross) (lead: Eddie Kendricks)
"The Impossible Dream" (Mitch Leigh, Joe Darion) (lead: Paul Williams)
"Runaway Child, Running Wild" (Whitfield, Barrett Strong) (lead: Dennis Edwards, Paul Williams, Eddie Kendricks, Melvin Franklin, Otis Williams)
"Don't Let the Joneses Get You Down" (Whitfield, Strong) (lead: Dennis Edwards, Melvin Franklin, Eddie Kendricks, Paul Williams, Otis Williams)
"A Time For Us" (Nino Rota, Henry Mancini) (lead: Eddie Kendricks)
"I Can't Get Next To You" (Whitfield, Strong) (lead: Dennis Edwards, Melvin Franklin, Eddie Kendricks, Paul Williams, Otis Williams)
"This Guy's In Love With You" (Burt Bacharach, Hal David) (lead: Otis Williams)
"Introduction of Band and Group"
"I've Gotta Be Me" (Walter Marks) (lead: Paul Williams)
"(I Know) I'm Losing You" (Grant, Whitfield, Holland) (lead: Dennis Edwards)
"Cloud Nine" (lead: Dennis Edwards, Paul Williams, Eddie Kendricks, Melvin Franklin, Otis Williams)
"Everything Is Going To Be Alright" (lead: Dennis Edwards)

Personnel
Burt Rhodes and His Orchestra
Cornelius Grant – lead guitar, musical director
Bill White – bass
Melvin Brown – drums
Stacey Edwards – congas

References

1970 live albums
The Temptations live albums
albums produced by Norman Smith (record producer)
Gordy Records live albums